This is a list of African Americans who have served in the United States Senate. The Senate has had eleven African-American elected or appointed officeholders. Two each served during both the nineteenth and twentieth centuries.

Of the eight African Americans ever to sit in the U.S. Senate since the African American Civil Rights Movement, three held Illinois's Class 3 seat, including Barack Obama, who went on to become the president of the United States. This makes Illinois the state with the most African-American U.S. senators to date. 

In 2016, Kamala Harris became the first African American to be elected a U.S. senator from California. Harris would go on to become the first African-American vice president of the United States and first African-American president of the United States Senate.

Of the 11 African-American senators, seven were popularly elected (including one that previously had been appointed by his state's governor), two were elected by the state legislature prior to the ratification of the Seventeenth Amendment to the United States Constitution in 1913 (which mandated the direct election of U.S. senators by the people of each state), and two were appointed by a state governor and not subsequently elected.

Background
The United States Senate is the upper house of the bicameral United States Congress, which is the legislative branch of the federal government of the United States. The U.S. Census Bureau defines "African Americans" as citizens or residents of the United States who have origins in any of the black populations of Africa. The term is generally used for Americans with at least partial ancestry in any of the original peoples of sub-Saharan Africa.

During the founding of the federal government, African Americans were consigned to a status of second-class citizenship or enslaved.  No African American served in federal elective office before the ratification in 1870 of the Fifteenth Amendment to the United States Constitution, although some (including Alexander Twilight, as state senator in Vermont) served in state elective offices concurrently with slavery. The Fifteenth Amendment prohibits the federal and state governments from denying any citizen the right to vote because of that citizen's race, color, or previous condition of servitude.

History

Reconstruction to Obama: 1870-2011

The first two African-American senators represented the state of Mississippi during the Reconstruction era, following the American Civil War.  Hiram Rhodes Revels, the first African American to serve in the Senate, was elected by the Mississippi State Legislature to succeed Albert G. Brown, who resigned during the Civil War. Some Democratic members of the United States Senate opposed his being seated based on the court case Dred Scott v. Sandford (1857) by the Supreme Court of the United States, claiming that Revels did not meet the nine-year citizenship requirement, but the majority of senators voted to seat him.

In 1872, the Louisiana state legislature elected P. B. S. Pinchback to the Senate. However, the 1872 elections in Louisiana were challenged by white Democrats, and Pinchback was never seated in Congress.

The Mississippi state legislature elected Blanche Bruce in 1875, but Republicans lost power of the Mississippi state legislature in 1876. Bruce was not elected to a second term in 1881. In 1890, the Democratic-dominated state legislature passed a new constitution disfranchising most black voters. Every other Southern state also passed disfranchising constitutions by 1908, thus excluding African Americans from the political system in the entire former Confederacy. This situation persisted well into the 1960s, when federal enforcement of constitutional rights under the Voting Rights Act of 1965 commenced.

The next black United States senator, Edward Brooke of Massachusetts, took office in 1967.  He was the first African American to be elected by popular vote after the ratification in 1913 of the Seventeenth Amendment to the United States Constitution, which established direct election of United States senators instead of indirect election by a state legislature. A Republican, Brooke was the first black Senator to serve two terms in the Senate, holding office until 1979. From 1979 to 1993, there were no black members of the United States Senate.

Between 1993 and 2010, three black members of the Illinois Democratic Party would hold Illinois’s Class 3 Senate seat at different times. Carol Moseley Braun entered the Senate in 1993 and was the first African-American woman in the Senate. She served one term. Barack Obama entered the Senate in 2005 and, in 2008, became the first African American to be elected president of the United States. Obama was still a Senator when he was elected President and Roland Burris, also an African American, was appointed to fill the remainder of Obama's Senate term. Burris only briefly ran for re-election and did not enter the Democratic primary. From 2011 to 2013, there were no black senators for the first time since Obama was elected in 2004.

Contemporary Period: 2013-present
Following Obama's election as president, the next two black senators, Tim Scott of South Carolina and Mo Cowan of Massachusetts, were both appointed by governors to fill the terms of Jim DeMint and John Kerry, respectively, who had resigned their positions. Thus, 2013 marked the first time in history that more than one African American served in the Senate at the same time. On October 16 of that year, citizens of New Jersey elected Cory Booker in a special election to fill the seat of the late senator Frank R. Lautenberg. Sworn into office, Booker was the first African-American senator to be elected since Obama and the first to represent the state of New Jersey. He was later elected a full six-year term in the 2014 mid-term elections. Scott retained his seat in a special election in 2014 and also secured a full six-year term in 2016.

In 2017, Scott and Booker were joined by Kamala Harris of California. Harris was the second African-American woman to serve in the U.S. Senate, and, in 2020, was elected as the first female vice president of the United States. In 2021, Raphael Warnock of Georgia was elected as the first African-American Democrat to represent a former Confederate state in the U.S. Senate.

As of January 20, 2021, there have been 1,994 members of the United States Senate, of which 11 have been African American.

List of African-American U.S. senators

African Americans elected to the United States Senate, but not seated

List of states represented by African Americans or black people
Seven states have been represented by black senators. As of January 2021, three states are represented by black senators.

Graphs

Histograph
The histograph below sets forth the number of African Americans who served in the United States Senate during the periods provided.

Elections with two African-American major party nominees
Incumbent Senators are in bold.

See also
Federal government

African Americans in the United States Congress
List of African-American United States representatives
Congressional Black Caucus
Congressional Black Caucus Foundation
List of African-American United States Cabinet members
List of African American firsts

State and local government
African-American officeholders in the United States, 1789–1866
List of African-American officeholders during Reconstruction
List of African-American U.S. state firsts
List of first African-American mayors

Notes

References

Further reading

  The website, Black Americans in Congress maintained by the Clerk of the United States House of Representatives, serves as an ongoing supplement to the book. To download a free copy of the entire publication or a specific portion of the publication, see H. Doc. 108–224 – Black Americans in Congress 1870 – 2007. Made available by the United States Government Printing Office (GPO).

External links
"African American Senators" – United States Senate official website
"African American Members of the United States Congress: 1870–2012" – 66-page history produced by the Congressional Research Service, a legislative branch agency within the Library of Congress
"Biographical Directory of the United States Congress, 1774 – Present" – perform search of desired representative or delegate by last name, first name, position, state, party, by year or congress
"Black Americans in Congress, 1870–2007" – 164-minute C-SPAN video with Matt Wasniewski, historian of the United States House of Representatives, as the presenter discussing the history of African Americans in Congress from 1870 to 2007
"Black Americans in Congress" – maintained by the Clerk of the United States House of Representatives, serves as an ongoing supplement to the book Black Americans in Congress: 1870–2007
"Major African American Office Holders Since 1641" – maintained by Blackpast.org, includes a listing for the United States Senate

Senators
African-American United States senators
African-Amer
African-American
Lists of African-American people